The Treaty of Union is the name usually now given to the treaty which led to the creation of the new state of Great Britain, providing that the Kingdom of England (which already included Wales) and the Kingdom of Scotland were to be "United into One Kingdom by the Name of Great Britain". At the time it was more often referred to as the Articles of Union.

The details of the Treaty were agreed on 22 July 1706, and separate Acts of Union were then passed by the parliaments of England and Scotland to put the agreed Articles into effect. The political union took effect on 1 May 1707.

Status
The status of the Treaty or Articles of Union as an international treaty is challenged by T. B. Smith. He argued that the Treaty is better described as a 'record of negotiations' between commissioners and that the Acts of Union 1707 constitute the actual treaty. The Scottish parliamentary debate subsequently amended the document when producing their Act of Union, which can itself be described as an offer of treaty terms.

Smith argues further that this debate is redundant because the obligants under the treaty 'disappeared in 1707' and replaced by a new state, which was not party to a treaty, or combined into a successor state to the Kingdom of England. A treaty requires at least two parties, so it ceased to exist with the Kingdom of Scotland.

This position is rejected by David Walker, who argues that its treaty status is 'amply evidenced' by previous legislation, that the Articles and other legislation refer to it as a "treaty".

Background
Queen Elizabeth I of England and Ireland, last monarch of the Tudor dynasty, died without issue on 24 March 1603, and the throne fell at once (and uncontroversially) to her first cousin twice removed, James VI of Scotland, a member of the House of Stuart and the only son of Mary, Queen of Scots.  By the Union of the Crowns in 1603 he assumed the throne of the Kingdom of England and the Kingdom of Ireland as King James I.  This personal union lessened the constant English fears of Scottish cooperation with France in a feared French invasion of England.

After this personal union, the new monarch, James I and VI, sought to unite the Kingdom of Scotland and the Kingdom of England into a state which he referred to as "Great Britain".  Nevertheless, Acts of Parliament attempting to unite the two countries failed in 1606, 1667, and 1689.

Beginning in 1698, the Company of Scotland sponsored the Darien scheme, an ill-fated attempt to establish a Scottish trading colony in the Isthmus of Panama, collecting from Scots investments equal to one-quarter of all the money circulating in Scotland at the time. In the face of opposition by English commercial interests, the Company of Scotland also raised subscriptions in Amsterdam, Hamburg, and London for its scheme. For his part, King William III of England and II of Scotland had given only lukewarm support to the Scottish colonial endeavour. England was at war with France, and hence did not want to offend Spain, which claimed the territory as part of New Granada.

England was also under pressure from the London-based East India Company, which was anxious to maintain its monopoly over English foreign trade. It therefore forced the English and Dutch investors to withdraw. Next, the East India Company threatened legal action, on the grounds that the Scots had no authority from the king to raise funds outside the king's realm, and obliged the promoters to refund subscriptions to the Hamburg investors. This left no source of finance but Scotland itself.  The colonisation ended in a military confrontation with the Spanish in 1700, but most colonists died of tropical diseases. This was an economic disaster for the Scottish ruling class investors and diminished the resistance of the Scottish political establishment to the idea of political union with England. It ultimately supported the union, despite some popular opposition and anti-union riots in Edinburgh, Glasgow, and elsewhere.

Deeper political integration had been a key policy of Queen Anne ever since she had acceded to the thrones of the three kingdoms in 1702. Under the aegis of the Queen and her ministers in both kingdoms, in 1705 the parliaments of England and Scotland agreed to participate in fresh negotiations for a treaty of union.

Treaty negotiations
It was agreed that England and Scotland would each appoint thirty-one commissioners to conduct the negotiations. The Scottish Parliament then began to arrange an election of the commissioners to negotiate on behalf of Scotland, but in September 1705, the leader of the Country Party, the Duke of Hamilton, who had previously attempted to obstruct the negotiation of a treaty, proposed that the Scottish commissioners should be nominated by the Queen, and this was agreed. In practice, the Scottish commissioners were nominated on the advice of the Duke of Queensberry and the Duke of Argyll.

Of the Scottish commissioners who were subsequently appointed, twenty-nine were members of the governing Court Party, while one was a member of the Squadron Volante. At the head of the list was Queensberry himself, with the Lord Chancellor of Scotland, the Earl of Seafield. George Lockhart of Carnwath, a member of the opposition Cavalier Party, was the only commissioner opposed to union. The thirty-one English commissioners included government ministers and officers of state, such as the Lord High Treasurer, the Earl of Godolphin, the Lord Keeper, Lord Cowper, and a large number of Whigs who supported union. Most Tories in the Parliament of England were not in favour of a union, and only one was among the commissioners.

Negotiations between the English and Scottish commissioners began on 16 April 1706 at the Cockpit-in-Court in London. The sessions opened with speeches from William Cowper, the English Lord Keeper, and from Lord Seafield, the Scottish Lord Chancellor, each describing the significance of the task. The commissioners did not carry out their negotiations face to face, but in separate rooms. They communicated their proposals and counter-proposals to each other in writing, and there was a blackout on news from the negotiations. Each side had its own particular concerns. Within a few days, England gained a guarantee that the Hanoverian dynasty would succeed Queen Anne to the Scottish crown, and Scotland received a guarantee of access to colonial markets, in the hope that they would be placed on an equal footing in terms of trade.

After the negotiations ended on 22 July 1706, acts of parliament were drafted by both parliaments to implement the agreed Articles of Union. The Scottish proponents of union believed that failure to agree to the Articles would result in the imposition of a union under less favourable terms, and English troops were stationed just south of the Scottish border and also in northern Ireland as an "encouragement". Months of fierce debate in both capital cities and throughout both kingdoms followed. In Scotland, the debate on occasion dissolved into civil disorder, most notably by the notorious 'Edinburgh Mob'. The prospect of a union of the kingdoms was deeply unpopular among the Scottish population at large, and talk of an uprising was widespread. However, the treaty was signed and the documents were rushed south with a large military escort.

The Kingdom of Great Britain was born on 1 May 1707, shortly after the parliaments of Scotland and England had ratified the Treaty of Union by each approving Acts of Union combining the two parliaments and the powers of the two crowns. Scotland's crown, sceptre, and sword of state remained at Edinburgh Castle. Queen Anne (already Queen of both England and Scotland) formally became the first occupant of the unified throne of Great Britain, with Scotland sending forty-five members to the new House of Commons of Great Britain, as well as representative peers to the House of Lords.

Significant financial payoffs to Scottish parliamentarians were later referred to by Robert Burns when he wrote "We're bought and sold for English gold, Such a Parcel of Rogues in a Nation!" Some recent historians, however, have emphasized the legitimacy of the vote.

The Articles of Union
The Treaty consisted of twenty-five Articles.

Article 1 provided that the kingdoms of Scotland and England would, from 1 May 1707, be united into one kingdom named Great Britain, with its own royal coat of arms and a flag combining the crosses of St Andrew and St George.

Article 2 provided for the succession of the House of Hanover to the throne of Great Britain, and for a Protestant succession, as set out in the English Act of Settlement of 1701.

Article 3 provided for the creation of one unified Parliament of Great Britain.

Article 4 gave the subjects of Great Britain freedom of trade and navigation within the kingdom and the "Dominions and Plantations thereunto belonging".

Articles 5 to 15, 17, and 18 dealt with a register of British trading ships, customs and duties on import and export, weights and measures, movement, taxes, regulation of trade, and other matters, to ensure equal treatment for all subjects of the new kingdom.

Article 16 required the introduction of a common currency for Great Britain, subsequently effected through the Scottish recoinage of 1707–1710, and the continuation of a Scottish Mint.

Article 19 provided for the continuation of the Court of Session, the High Court of Justiciary, and the separate Scottish legal system.

Article 20 provided for the protection after the union of a number of heritable offices, superiorities, heritable jurisdictions, offices for life, and jurisdictions for life.

Article 21 provided for the protection of the rights of the royal burghs.

Article 22 provided for Scotland to be represented in the new Parliament of Great Britain by sixteen representative peers and forty-five members of the House of Commons.

Article 23 provided for Scotland's peers to have the same rights as English peers in any trial of peers.

Article 24 provided for the creation of a new Great Seal of Great Britain, different from those of England and Scotland, but it also provided that the Great Seal of England was to be used until this had been created; a Great Seal of Scotland for use in Scotland; and that the Honours of Scotland, the Records of the Parliament of Scotland and all other records, rolls and registers be kept and remain in Scotland.

Article 25 provided that all laws of either kingdom that may be inconsistent with the Articles in the Treaty were declared void.

Commissioners 
The following commissioners were appointed to negotiate the Treaty of Union:

Kingdom of England

William Cowper, 1st Baron Cowper, Lord Keeper of the Great Seal
Sidney Godolphin, 1st Earl of Godolphin, Lord High Treasurer
Thomas Herbert, 8th Earl of Pembroke, Lord President of the Council
John Holles, 1st Duke of Newcastle, Lord Privy Seal
Henry Boyle, Chancellor of the Exchequer
Sir Charles Hedges, Secretary of State for the Southern Department
Robert Harley, Secretary of State for the Northern Department
Charles Paulet, 2nd Duke of Bolton
Thomas Tenison, Archbishop of Canterbury
Charles Howard, 3rd Earl of Carlisle
Sir John Cooke, Advocate-General
John Manners, Marquess of Granby
Sir Simon Harcourt, Solicitor General
Charles Montagu, 1st Baron Halifax
William Cavendish, Marquess of Hartington
Sir John Holt, Lord Chief Justice
Evelyn Pierrepont, 5th Earl of Kingston-upon-Hull
Sir Edward Northey, Attorney General
Ralph Grey, 4th Baron Grey of Werke
Edward Russell, 1st Earl of Orford
Lord William Powlett, Member of Parliament for Winchester
John Smith, Speaker of the House of Commons
John Somers, 1st Baron Somers
Charles Seymour, 6th Duke of Somerset
Charles Spencer, 3rd Earl of Sunderland
Charles Townshend, 2nd Viscount Townshend
Sir Thomas Trevor, Chief Justice of the Common Pleas
Dr. Stephen Waller, Doctor of Law
Thomas Wharton, 5th Baron Wharton
Charles Powlett, Marquess of Winchester
John Sharp, Archbishop of York

Kingdom of Scotland

James Ogilvy, 1st Earl of Seafield, Lord Chancellor
James Douglas, 2nd Duke of Queensberry, Lord Privy Seal
John Erskine, Earl of Mar, Secretary of State
Hugh Campbell, 3rd Earl of Loudoun, Secretary of State
David Boyle, 1st Earl of Glasgow, Treasurer-depute
Lord Archibald Campbell
Daniel Campbell of Shawfield, Commissioner for Inveraray
John Clerk of Penicuik, Commissioner for Whithorn
Adam Cockburn, Lord Ormiston, Lord Justice Clerk
Sir David Dalrymple of Hailes, 1st Baronet, Commissioner for Culross
Hew Dalrymple, Lord North Berwick, Lord President of the Court of Session and Commissioner for North Berwick
Robert Dundas, Lord Arniston, Commissioner for Edinburghshire
Thomas Hay, Viscount Dupplin
Alexander Grant of that Ilk, Commissioner for Inverness-shire
Sir Patrick Johnston, Commissioner for Edinburgh
David Melville, 3rd Earl of Leven
George Lockhart of Carnwath, Commissioner for Lanarkshire
Francis Montgomerie of Giffen, Commissioner for the Treasury and Commissioner for Ayrshire
Hugh Montgomerie of Busbie, Commissioner for Glasgow
William Morrison of Prestongrange, Commissioner for Peeblesshire
James Douglas, 11th Earl of Morton
Sir Alexander Ogilvy of Forglen, 1st Baronet, Commissioner for Banff
Archibald Primrose, 1st Earl of Rosebery
William Ross, 12th Lord Ross, Commissioner for the Treasury
William Seton of Pittmedden, Commissioner for Aberdeenshire
Sir James Smollett of Stainflett and Bonhill, Commissioner for Dumbarton
John Dalrymple, 1st Earl of Stair
Dougald Stewart of Blairhill, Commissioner for Rothesay
Robert Stewart of Tillicoultry, Commissioner for Bute
John Gordon, 16th Earl of Sutherland
David Wemyss, 4th Earl of Wemyss

Notes

References

Further reading
 Bowie, Karin. Scottish Public Opinion and the Anglo-Scottish Union, 1699-1707 (Boydell & Brewer, 2007).
 Bowie, Karin. Public opinion in early modern Scotland, c. 1560–1707 (Cambridge University Press, 2020).
 Bowie, Karin. "A 1706 manifesto for an armed rising against incorporating union." Scottish Historical Review 94.2 (2015): 237-267. online
 Carruthers, Gerard, and Colin Kidd, eds. Literature and Union: Scottish Texts, British Contexts (Oxford University Press, 2018).

 Ferguson, William. "The Making of the Treaty of Union of 1707." Scottish Historical Review 43.136 (1964): 89-110. online
 Ferguson, William. Scotland's Relations with England: a survey to 1707 (1994)
 Fry, Michael. The Union: England, Scotland and the Treaty of 1707 (2006)

  Harris, Bob.  "The Anglo Scottish Treaty of Union, 1707 in 2007: Defending the Revolution, Defeating the Jacobites," Journal of British Studies (2010), Vol. 49, No. 1: 28–46. in JSTOR Historiography
 Jackson, Alvin. The two Unions: Ireland, Scotland, and the survival of the United Kingdom, 1707-2007 (OUP Oxford, 2011).
 Mackillop, Andrew. "Chapter 7 A Union for Empire? Scotland, the English East India Company and the British Union." Scottish Historical Review 87.2 (suppl (2008): 116-134.
 Macinnes, Allan I. "The Treaty of Union: Made in England." in Scotland and the Union 1707-2007 (Edinburgh University Press, 2022) pp. 54-74.
 Macinnes, Allan I. "Treaty of Union: Voting Patterns and Political Influence," Historical Social Research / Historische Sozialforschung (1989) 14#3 pp. 53–61 in JSTOR, statistical analysis
 Murdoch, Alexander. Making the Union Work: Scotland, 1651–1763 (Routledge, 2020).

 Raffe, Alasdair. "1707, 2007, and the Unionist turn in Scottish history." Historical Journal 53.4 (2010): 1071-1083. online
 Riley, Patrick William Joseph. "The Union of 1707 as an episode in English politics." English Historical Review 84.332 (1969): 498-527.

 Smout, T. C. "The Anglo-Scottish Union of 1707. I. The Economic Background." Economic History Review 16.3 (1964): 455-467. online

External links 
The Treaty of Union, the Scottish Parliament
Text of Union with England Act
Text of Union with Scotland Act
 From Daniel Defoe's Collection of Original Papers and Material Transactions Concerning the late Great Affair of the Union between England and Scotland (1711):
 Text of the "Articles of Union" (the Treaty)
 Text of the Scottish Ratifying Act
 Text of the English Ratifying Act

1706 treaties
1706 in England
1706 in Scotland
Treaties of England
Treaties of Scotland
1707 treaties
England–Scotland relations
History of Great Britain